Beaverdam Creek is a stream in southwest Audrain County in the U.S. state of Missouri. It is a tributary of the South Fork of the Salt River which it joins approximately six miles southeast of Mexico.

Beaverdam Creek was named for the beaver dams along its course.

See also
List of rivers of Missouri

References

Rivers of Audrain County, Missouri
Rivers of Missouri